A list of the discography of Christian rock band Building 429.

Albums

EPs 

Building 429 also released some studio series performance tracks for the following songs: "We Won't Be Shaken", "Where I Belong", "Fearless", "Walls Are Coming Down", "No One Else Knows", "Listen to the Sound", "I Belong to You", "Grace That Is Greater", "Power of Your Name", "You Carried Me", "I Believe", "Glory Defined" and "Space In Between Us".

Compilations

Singles

Other charted songs

Music videos

Notes

References

Discographies of American artists
Christian music discographies